Choricystis is a genus of green algae in the class Trebouxiophyceae, considered a characteristic picophytoplankton in freshwater ecosystems. Choricystis, especially the type species , has been proposed as an effective source of fatty acids for biofuels. Choricystis algacultures have been shown to survive on wastewater. In particular, Choricystis has been proposed as a biological water treatment system for industrial waste produced by the processing of dairy goods.

Choricystis have been found in natural bodies of water in South America, North America, Europe, Asia, and Antarctica. They have been observed as an endosymbiont of freshwater sponges as well as ciliates like Paramecium bursaria.

Use as a biofuel
Triglycerides and other lipids can be transesterified to produce fatty acid methyl esters, the primary component of biodiesel fuels. Because of their high lipid content and rate of lipid production, Choricystis algae have been suggested as effective microalgae for industrial biofuel production. Molecular profiles of C. minor have noted its high proportion of neutral (as opposed to polar) lipids, considered preferable in biodiesel production.

See also
 Algae fuel
 Lipid extraction
 Sewage treatment

References

Trebouxiophyceae genera
Trebouxiophyceae